Mazi Bon (also Romanized as Māẕī Bon; also known as Māzūbon) is a village in Eshkevar-e Sofla Rural District, Rahimabad District, Rudsar County, Gilan Province, Iran. At the 2006 census, its population was 94, in 24 families.

References 

Populated places in Rudsar County